Soldier Synagogue is the only active synagogue in Rostov-on-Don. It was built in 1872. The synagogue burnt down during the pogrom of 1905, but in 1913-1914 the building was restored. In 1935, the synagogue was closed for worship. After World War II the building was again transferred to the local Jewish community. Soldier Synagogue has the status of an object of cultural heritage of regional significance.

History 
In 1862, retired Jewish soldiers established Jewish Prayer Society in Rostov-on-Don. On May 31, 1862, the Yekaterinoslav province government gave to society a permission to rent a separate room for worship rituals. The project of Choral Synagogue was approved by Rosotov authorities on June 4, 1872, and in the same year the building was constructed. According to some reports, the money for the construction of synagogues were donated by Rostov merchant Joseph Markovich Elitser. It is presumed that the architect of the synagogue was Ernst Ernestovich von Shulman, and the building contractor ― Moisey Leontyevich Geronimus.

The synagogue building was reconstructed several times. In 1881, in the east part of it there was attached a three-story brick building. In 1891, to the south wall of the synagogue there was also attached a two-storey building, the ground floor of which housed a school for children of poor soldiers, and the second floor was occupied by Prayer school. The Synagogue was seriously damaged by fire during the anti-Jewish pogrom in 1905. It was restored only in 1913–1914, when the necessary funds were collected. The author of the reconstruction project was Petersburg architect Yakov Germanovich Gevirts. Worship in the synagogue resumed on March 29, 1914, on the day of Passover.

In 1935, the synagogue was closed for worship. The building housed a chemical factory. During the war, these enterprises were evacuated from the city. In 1943, after the liberation of Rostov-on-Don, the synagogue was taken again by the Jewish community. Official permission to use the building by the Jewish community was sanctioned on April 14, 1945.

In 2005 a major overhaul of the synagogue was implemented. The corner dome, with stars of David that were lost in the 1940s, was restored. Reconstruction works were completed by the end of the year, and on 26 December the synagogue was opened.

Architecture 
The architecture of Soldier Synagogue has elements of Art Nouveau and Oriental styles. The building has a complex configuration plan. Three parts of the building volume are reduced to north–south axis.

The light openings in the top of the bindings are patterned, stylized with gothic rose. The cap of the synagogue is decorated with rustication, and the façade is decorated with stucco rosettes.

See also
History of the Jews in Rostov-on-Don

References 

Cultural heritage monuments in Rostov-on-Don
Jews and Judaism in Rostov-on-Don
Religious buildings and structures in Rostov-on-Don
Synagogues in Russia
Cultural heritage monuments of regional significance in Rostov Oblast